Amanda Alcantara is a Dominican-American writer and activist. She is the co-founder of La Galeria, a magazine focused on Dominican women, and the author of the blog Radical Latina. A graduate of Rutgers University, she has written for NY1 and El Diario, and Feministing.

Alcantara was employed at New York University's McSilver Institute for Poverty Policy and Research, leaving in August 2017.

References

External links

La Galeria magazine

Year of birth missing (living people)
Living people
Activists from New York (state)
American people of Dominican Republic descent
Rutgers University alumni
American feminist writers
American women bloggers
American bloggers
21st-century American women writers